John Conway Rees (13 January 1870 – 30 August 1932) was a Welsh international rugby union player.

Life
Rees was born in Llandovery, Carmarthenshire, Wales.  He was educated at Llandovery College and Jesus College, Oxford (graduating in 1894) and was the first Welshman to captain Oxford University RFC. He introduced the four three quarters system, playing at centre-three-quarter. He played for Cardiff, the Barbarians, the London Welsh, Richmond, Blackheath and Llanelli. He played for the Welsh national side on three occasions in the Home Nations Championship. His debut was on 6 February 1892 against Scotland. His other two appearances were against England, once in 1893 (the season when Wales first won the Triple Crown) and again in 1894. 

Rees taught at Sherborne School, Rossall School and Giggleswick School, before spending the last thirty years of his life working as a teacher in India. He died on 30 August 1932.

References

1870 births
1932 deaths
Alumni of Jesus College, Oxford
Barbarian F.C. players
Cardiff RFC players
Carmarthenshire cricketers
Cricketers from Llandovery
Llanelli RFC players
London Welsh RFC players
Oxford University RFC players
People educated at Llandovery College
Rugby union centres
Rugby union players from Llandovery
Wales international rugby union players
Welsh cricketers
Welsh rugby union players
Welsh schoolteachers